Filippo Randazzo (born 27 April 1996) is an Italian male long jumper. He competed at the 2020 Summer Olympics, in Long jump.

Career
He was 7th at 2017 European Athletics Indoor Championships. His indoor personal best is a measure over the eight meters, exactly 8.05 m established in Ancona on 18 February 2017.

An injury occurred in April 2022 prevented him from appearing in Rieti at the 2022 Italian Athletics Championships where he would have had to defend the title in the long jump he had won in the previous five editions, as well as taking part in the 2022 World Athletics Championships in Eugene, Oregon. where he had also qualified thanks to the target number.

Statistics

Personal best
Long jump outdoor: 8.12 m,  Savona, 16 July 2020
Long jump indoor: 8.05 m,  Ancona, 18 February 2017

Achievements

Circuit wins
Diamond League
British Grand Prix long jump: 2021 (8.11 m )

National titles
Randazzo won eight national championships at individual senior level.

Italian Athletics Championships
Long jump: 2015, 2017, 2018, 2019, 2020, 2021 (6)
Italian Athletics Indoor Championships
Long jump: 2022, 2023 (2)

See also
 Italian all-time lists - Long jump

Notes

References

External links

1996 births
Living people
Italian male long jumpers
Athletics competitors of Fiamme Gialle
Italian Athletics Championships winners
Athletes (track and field) at the 2020 Summer Olympics
Sportspeople from Catania
Olympic athletes of Italy